Bárbara Muñoz may refer to:

Bárbara Muñoz (singer)
Bárbara Muñoz (footballer)